Lisuride, sold under the brand name Dopergin among others, is a monoaminergic medication of the ergoline class which is used in the treatment of Parkinson's disease, migraine, and high prolactin levels. It is taken by mouth.

Side effects of lisuride include nausea and decreased blood pressure, among others. Lisuride acts as a mixed agonist and antagonist of dopamine, serotonin, and adrenergic receptors. Activation of specific dopamine receptors is thought to be responsible for its effectiveness in the treatment of Parkinson's disease and ability to suppress prolactin levels, while interactions with serotonin receptors are thought to be principally involved in its effectiveness for migraine.

Medical uses
Lisuride is used to lower prolactin and, in low doses, to prevent migraine attacks. The use of lisuride as initial antiparkinsonian medication for Parkinson's disease has been advocated, delaying the need for levodopa until lisuride becomes insufficient for controlling the parkinsonian symptoms. Evidence is insufficient to support lisuride in the treatment of advanced Parkinson's disease as an alternative to levodopa or bromocriptine.

Side effects
Side effects of lisuride include nausea and lowered blood pressure, among others.

Pharmacology

Pharmacodynamics
Lisuride is a ligand of dopamine, serotonin, and adrenergic receptors as well as the histamine H1 receptor. It has sub-nanomolar affinity for the dopamine D2, and D3 receptors, serotonin 5-HT1A and 5-HT1D receptors, and α2A-, α2B-, and α2C-adrenergic receptors, and low-nanomolar affinity for the dopamine D1, D4, and D5 receptors, serotonin 5-HT2A, 5-HT2B, and 5-HT2C receptors, α1A-, α1B-, and α1D-adrenergic receptors, and histamine H1 receptor. Lisuride is a partial agonist of the D2, D3, D4, 5-HT2A, 5-HT2C, 5-HT5A, and H1 receptors, a full or near-full agonist of the 5-HT1A, 5-HT1B, and 5-HT1D receptors, and a silent antagonist of the 5-HT2B receptor and α1A-, α2A-, α2B-, and α2C-adrenergic receptors. Due to its highly non-selective pharmacological activity, lisuride is described as a "dirty drug". The effectiveness of lisuride in Parkinson's disease and hyperprolactinemia is thought to be mostly due to activation of dopamine D2 receptors.

While lisuride has a similar receptor binding profile to the more well-known and chemically similar ergoline lysergic acid diethylamide (LSD; N,N-diethyllysergamide) and acts as a partial agonist of the serotonin 5-HT2A receptor likewise, it lacks the psychedelic effects of LSD. Research suggests that the lack of psychedelic effects with lisuride arises from biased agonism of the 5-HT2A receptor. Stimulation of the 5-HT2A protomer within the 5-HT2A–mGlu2 receptor complex evokes psychedelic effects, while these effects do not occur during sole stimulation of monomeric 5-HT2A receptors. Accordingly, different G proteins are involved. Lisuride behaves as an agonist at the 5-HT2A receptor monomer. Since it competitively antagonizes the effects of LSD, it may be regarded as a protomer antagonist of the 5-HT2A–mGluR heteromer. GPCR oligomers are discrete entities and usually possess properties distinct from their parent monomeric receptors.

Lisuride dose-dependently suppresses prolactin levels due to its dopaminergic activity. As an antagonist of the 5-HT2B receptor, lisuride has no risk of cardiac valvulopathy in contrast to related ergolines like pergolide and cabergoline.

Pharmacokinetics
Absorption of lisuride from the gastrointestinal tract with oral administration is complete. The absolute bioavailability of lisuride is 10 to 20% due to high first-pass metabolism. The plasma protein binding of lisuride is 60 to 70%. Peak levels of lisuride occur 60 to 80 minutes after ingestion with high variability between individuals. The elimination half-life of lisuride is approximately 2 hours. This is shorter than most other dopamine agonists. Lisuride has more than 15 known metabolites.

Chemistry
Lisuride is described as the free base and as the hydrogen maleate salt.

Bromination of lisuride gives bromerguride (2-bromolisuride), which has a "reversed pharmacodynamic profile" compared to that of lisuride.

History
Lisuride was synthesized by Zikán and Semonský at the Research Institute for Pharmacy and Biochemistry at Prague (later SPOFA) as an antimigraine agent analogous to methysergide and was described in 1960. It was marketed by the early 1970s.

Society and culture

Generic names

Brand names
Lisuride has been sold under brand names including Arolac, Cuvalit, Dopagon, Dopergin, Dopergine, Eunal, Lisenil, Lizenil, Lysenyl, Proclacam, Prolacam, and Revanil.

Availability
Lisuride was previously more widely available throughout the world, but as of 2020 it appears to be marketed only in Egypt, France, Italy, Kuwait, Lebanon, Mexico, New Zealand, and Pakistan. Lisuride is not currently available in the United States, as the drug was not a commercial success in comparison with other dopamine receptor agonists.

Research
Preliminary clinical research suggests that transdermal administration of lisuride may be useful in the treatment of Parkinson's disease. As lisuride has poor bioavailability when taken orally and has a short half-life, continuous transdermal administration offers significant advantages and could make the compound a much more consistent therapeutic agent. Lisuride was under development as a transdermal patch and subcutaneous implant for the treatment of Parkinson's disease, restless legs syndrome, and dyskinesias in the 2000s and 2010s, but development was discontinued.

References 

Alpha-1 blockers
Alpha-2 blockers
Antimigraine drugs
D2-receptor agonists
D3 receptor agonists
D4 receptor agonists
Dopamine receptor modulators
Ergolines
Histamine agonists
Prolactin inhibitors
Serotonin receptor antagonists
Serotonin receptor agonists
Ureas